National Highway 275K (NH 275K) is a national highway in India. It is a secondary route of National Highway 75.  NH-275K runs in the state of Karnataka in India. This national highway forms the Mysore Ring Road around Mysore city.its old name is National Highway 75.

Route 
NH275K forms the Mysore Ring Road connecting Hinkal, Columbia Asia Hospital, APMC Bandipalya, and back to Hinkal around Mysore city.

Junctions  
 
  Terminal near Hinkal.
  near Columbia Asia Hospital
  near Columbia Asia Hospital
  near Naranahali
  near APMC Bandipalya
  Terminal near Hinkal.

Map

See also 
 List of National Highways in India
 List of National Highways in India by state

References

External links 

 NH 275K on OpenStreetMap

National highways in India
National Highways in Karnataka